Kim Kelly (born April 4, 1962 in Halifax, Nova Scotia as Kim Ackles) is a Canadian curler from Dartmouth, Nova Scotia. She currently throws skip stones  for Colleen Jones, whom she has won five national championships and two world championships.

In 2019, Kelly was named the eighth greatest Canadian curler in history in a TSN poll of broadcasters, reporters and top curlers.

Kelly had retired from competitive curling in 2006 but returned in 2010 playing third for Nancy Delahunt, failing to secure a spot in the provincial playdowns. She would then go on to join former teammate Mary-Anne Arsenault, playing the second position for the 2011–12 season.

For the 2012–2013 season Arsenault and Kelly reunited with former skip Colleen Jones, with the goal of reaching the 2014 Winter Olympics in Sochi, Russia. Jones played third or second position, while Arsenault was skip. Jenn Baxter, played lead, while Stephanie McVicar, joined the team as the fifth. Nancy Delahunt was offered to join the team as coach or manager. Since this announcement McVicar left the team to play with Heather Smith-Dacey, and Delahunt joined the team as the fifth. Jones played third, and Kelly remained at second.

Kelly (as third) joined Jones, Mary Sue Radford and Delahunt to win the 2016 Canadian Senior Curling Championships, following that with an undefeated run to win the 2017 World Senior Curling Championships in Lethbridge, Alberta.

Personal life
Kelly is married and has two children. She is a retired pharmacist.

References

External links

1962 births
Living people
Canadian women curlers
Canadian women's curling champions
Canadian mixed curling champions
Canadian people of English descent
World curling champions
Continental Cup of Curling participants
Canada Cup (curling) participants
Curlers from Nova Scotia
Sportspeople from Dartmouth, Nova Scotia
Sportspeople from Halifax, Nova Scotia